PopClips is a music video television program, the direct predecessor of MTV.

Former Monkee Mike Nesmith conceived the first music-video program as a promotional device for Warner Communications' record division. Production began in the spring of 1979 at SamFilm, a sound-stage built and operated in Sand City, California by Sam Harrison, a Monterey Peninsula College instructor with a motion picture background. The series was produced by Jac Holzman.

With an infinity cyclorama as the background, set flats were made from the Styrofoam packing used to ship laserdisc players and 3/4" video decks.  The first "VeeJay" was Jeff Michalski. The director was William Dear. Besides Harrison, the production team was made up of Bruce "Buz" Clarke, Keith Cornell, Marybeth Harris, and Leslie Chacon.

The program was broadcast weekly on the youth-oriented cable television channel Nickelodeon in late 1980 and early 1981. The channel's owners at the time, Warner Cable, wanted to buy the name and idea, but instead, according to Dear, "they just watered down the idea and came up with MTV."

PopClips was preceded by the video Elephant Parts (which won the first ever Grammy Award for Music Video), and followed by a second series titled Television Parts, both of which Nesmith hosted and produced.

References

External links
Mike Nesmith of the Monkees, Ian Watson, first published in Melody Maker

1980s American music television series
1980 American television series debuts
1981 American television series endings
1980s Nickelodeon original programming
Television series created by Michael Nesmith